Lalchandra or Lal Chandra Kol (born 12 July 1949) is an Indian politician. He stood for the 2004 Lok Sabha elections on the BSP ticket becoming a Member of Parliament from Robertsganj.

Expulsion

In the sting Operation Duryodhana 
for fielding fictitious questions in parliament.

On 23 December 2005 a Special Committee of the Lok Sabha found him guilty of
contempt of the House and following a motion calling for the expulsion of 
all 11 MPs caught in the sting, he was expelled from Parliament.

References

1949 births
Living people
People from Mirzapur district
India MPs 2004–2009
Lok Sabha members from Uttar Pradesh
People from Sonbhadra district
Bharatiya Janata Party politicians from Uttar Pradesh
Bahujan Samaj Party politicians from Uttar Pradesh